Próxima Estación: Esperanza is the second solo album by Manu Chao. The album was released in Europe in 2001. It was released in the United States on 5 June 2001 on Virgin Records.

Background
The album title comes from a sample of an announcement for the Esperanza station of Madrid Metro's Line 4; in Spanish "esperanza" means "hope". Another Line 4 station, named Avenida de la Paz (literally "Peace Avenue") is also mentioned several times on the album, but the two stations are actually several blocks apart, and the sample used by Chao actually consists of two separate announcements pasted together. The voice actor Javier Dotú and a Metro announcer later sued for infringement of intellectual property rights over the use of their voices.

Music and lyrics
Chao and others sing in Arabic, English, French, Galician, Portuguese and Spanish on this album. The backing track to "Homens", a tight rap about various kinds of men, written and performed by Brazilian journalist (and Chao's friend) Valeria dos Santos Costa, is identical to the backing track for "Bongo Bong", Chao's successful single from four years earlier; however, in the short documentary film Infinita tristeza (included within the bonus section of his 2002 live DVD Babylonia en Guagua), Chao stated that "Homens" was the song for which the well-known backing track was originally recorded. The final song on the album, "Infinita Tristeza", does not contain any vocals by Chao, but it consists of the same backing track as "Me Gustas Tú", over which several samples and soundbites are layered; most of them come from a cartoon-based TV documentary film about pregnancy and childbirth, produced in 1977 by TVE and aimed at children. A number of voice samples from the documentary are looped and repeated throughout the track in Chao's typical fragmented style.

Reception and legacy
Próxima Estación: Esperanza received a Grammy nomination for Best Latin Rock/Alternative Performance. In 2010 Esperanza was listed at #65 in Rolling Stones "Best Albums of the Decade." In 2012, the magazine listed it at No. 474 on its list of the 500 greatest albums of all time, saying "this gem gave Americans a taste of [Chao's] wild-ass greatness. Chao rocks an acoustic guitar over horns and beat-boxes while rambling multilingually about crucial topics from politics to pot."

Track listing

Charts

Weekly charts

Year-end charts

Sales and certifications

!scope="row"|Worldwide
|
|3,000,000
|-

See also
List of best-selling Latin albums

References

2001 albums
Manu Chao albums
Transport in Madrid
Virgin Records albums